"Apply Some Pressure" is a song by the English indie rock band Maxïmo Park. It was released as the second single from their first studio album, A Certain Trigger (2005), on 21 February 2005. The song was re-released in October 2005. The music was written by Duncan Lloyd and the lyrics by Paul Smith.

The song originally reached number 20 on the UK Singles Chart in February 2005 and later number 17 after its re-release. It was listed as the 352nd best song of the 2000s by Pitchfork. The song has been used in several video games such as SSX on Tour, Burnout Revenge, SingStar Rocks! and the PlayStation Portable version of Asphalt: Urban GT 2.

Track listings

21 February 2005 release
 CD (WAP185CD):
 "Apply Some Pressure" (Radio Edit) – 2:45
 "Fear of Falling" – 2:36

 Maxi-CD (WAP185CDX):
 "Apply Some Pressure" – 3:20
 "The Coast Is Always Changing" – 3:19
 "Fear of Falling" – 2:36
 "I Want You to Leave" – 2:18

 7" (7WAP185):
 "Apply Some Pressure" – 3:20
 "I Want You to Leave" – 2:18

 10" (10WAP185X):
 "Apply Some Pressure" – 3:20
 "The Coast Is Always Changing" – 3:19
 "Fear of Falling" – 2:36
 "I Want You to Leave" – 2:18

31 October 2005 re-release
 CD (WAP198CD):
 "Apply Some Pressure" – 3:20
 "My Life in Reverse" – 3:20
 "Once, a Glimpse" (Original Demo Version) – 3:27

 7" #1 (7WAP198, orange vinyl):
 "Apply Some Pressure" – 3:20
 "My Life in Reverse" – 3:20

 7" #2 (7WAP198R, clear vinyl):
 "Apply Some Pressure" (Live in Japan) – 3:22
 "Isolation" (John Lennon cover) – 1:14

Mark Ronson cover 
The song was re-worked by Mark Ronson for his album Version. The cover version features the Maxïmo Park singer Paul Smith on guest vocals. Smith recorded the vocals for Ronson after Ronson invited him to perform on the instrumental he had made based on the band's original.

Charts

References

External links
 

2005 singles
Maxïmo Park songs
2005 songs
Song recordings produced by Mark Ronson
Mark Ronson songs
Songs written by Duncan Lloyd
Songs written by Paul Smith (rock vocalist)
Song recordings produced by Paul Epworth
Warp (record label) singles